North High School may refer to:
 North High School (Phoenix, Arizona)
 North Pulaski High School, Jacksonville, Arkansas
 North High School (Bakersfield, California)
 John W. North High School, Riverside, California
 North High School (Torrance, California), California
 North High School (Denver, Colorado)
 North High School (Youngstown, Ohio), closed in 1980
 North Fort Myers High School, North Fort Myers, Florida
 Downers Grove North High School, Downers Grove, Illinois
 Lincoln-Way North High School, Frankfort Square, Illinois
 St. Charles North High School, St. Charles, Illinois
 North High School (Indiana), Evansville, Indiana
 North High School (Davenport, Iowa)
 North High School (Des Moines, Iowa)
 North High School (Sioux City, Iowa)
 North High School (Kansas), Wichita, Kansas
 North Hagerstown High School, Hagerstown, Maryland
 Newton North High School, Newton, Massachusetts
 North High School (Worcester, Massachusetts)
 North Community High School, Minneapolis, Minnesota
 North High School (North St. Paul, Minnesota)
 Omaha North High School, Omaha, Nebraska
 Toms River High School North, Tom's River, New Jersey
 Williamsville North High School, Williamsville, New York
 North High School (North Dakota), Fargo, North Dakota
 North High School (Akron, Ohio)
 North High School (Columbus, Ohio)
 North High School (Eastlake, Ohio)
 North High School (Springfield, Ohio)
 Westerville North High School, Westerville, Ohio
 Edmond North High School, Edmond, Oklahoma
 North High School (Eau Claire, Wisconsin)
 Sheboygan North High School, Sheboygan, Wisconsin

See also 
 Northern High School (disambiguation)
 North School (disambiguation)